Amplicincia fletcheri is a moth of the subfamily Arctiinae. It was described by William D. Field in 1950. It is found in Jamaica.

References

Moths described in 1950
Lithosiini
Moths of the Caribbean